China–Israel relations (In Chinese : 中以关系 Zhōng yǐ guānxì. In Hebrew : יחסי ישראל-סין Yechasei Yisrael-Sin) comprise the diplomatic, economic, cultural, and military ties between the People's Republic of China and the State of Israel.

In 1950, Israel was the first country in the Middle East to recognize the PRC as the legitimate government of China. However, China did not establish normal diplomatic relations with Israel until 1992. Since then, Israel and China have developed increasingly close economic, military and technological links with each other. Israel maintains an embassy in Beijing and is planning to open a new consulate in Chengdu, its third in Mainland China. China is Israel's third largest trading partner globally and largest trading partner in East Asia. Trade volume increased from $50 million in 1992 to over $10 billion in 2013. Some commentators note similarities between the cultures and values of the two nations. Convergence of interests has made them natural partners. China is one of the few countries in the world to concurrently maintain warm relations with Israel, Palestine, and the Muslim world at large.

China's status as a potential world power has prompted Israel to maintain close ties with the country and integrate China's global influence with Israel's economic management.

History
In the 1930s, David Ben-Gurion, then leader of the Yishuv in Palestine, proclaimed that China would be one of the great world powers of the future. For some time after the 1949 Chinese revolution, the People's Republic of China (PRC) was diplomatically isolated, because the United States and its allies, including Israel, recognized the Republic of China (ROC, commonly known as Taiwan after 1949) as the sole legitimate government of China. The Nationalist government of the ROC had been historically sympathetic to the Zionist cause, while Sun Yat-sen affirmed his support for the creation of a Jewish state.

In 1947, however, the ROC abstained from voting in the United Nations Partition Plan for Palestine. During the 1955 Asian–African Conference, China (under the PRC) expressed support for the Palestinian right of return, but refrained from denying Israel's right to exist and secretly pursued trade ties with the Israelis. Until the 1980s, China refused to grant visas to Israelis unless they held dual citizenship and carried a passport of a country other than Israel. However, following the Sino-Soviet split and China's 1979 establishment of diplomatic relations with the United States, China began to develop a series of secret, non-official ties with Israel.

China and Israel secretly began building military ties in the 1980s during the Soviet–Afghan War, which both Israel and China opposed. They both supplied weapons to the Afghan mujahideen (Israel sending captured PLO weapons via the United States and Pakistan), and military cooperation between the two began in order to assist the Islamic resistance against the Soviets. China and Israel subsequently started exchanging visits of delegations of academics, experts, businessmen and industrialists. Reportedly, a large number of the heavy tanks used in China's 1984 National Day parades were retrofitted by Israel from captured Six-Day War equipment.

China eased travel restrictions, while Israel reopened its consulate in Hong Kong (then under British administration), which would serve as the main point for diplomatic and economic contact between the two nations. In 1987 Israel's Prime Minister, Shimon Peres, appointed Amos Yudan to set up the first official Government owned company (Copeco Ltd) to establish and foster commercial activities between companies in China and Israel. The company was active until 1992, when official diplomatic relationships were announced between Israel and China. In the early 1990s, China joined a number of nations who established ties with Israel after the initiation of a peace process between Israel and the PLO in the early 1990s; it also desired to play a role in the peace process.

Prior to the establishment of full diplomatic relations in 1992, Israel and China established representative offices in Beijing and Tel Aviv, which functioned as de facto embassies. The Israeli office was formally known as the Liaison Office of the Israel Academy of Sciences and Humanities. This was opened in June 1990. China was similarly represented by a branch of the China International Travel Service, which also opened in 1990.

Prime Minister Benjamin Netanyahu visited China in May 2013 and five agreements were signed during his visit. The G2G (Government to Government) mechanism was established and five task forces were set up in high tech, environmental protection, energy, agriculture and financing. Netanyahu visited China again in 2017 amid celebrations taking place to commemorate 25 years of ties between the two countries.

During the 2014 Israel–Gaza conflict, it was reported that Israel was winning the public opinion battle in China with most Chinese social media users siding with Israel.

In May 2020, the Chinese ambassador to Israel, Du Wei, was found dead at his home in Herzliya. While the exact cause of his death is unknown, it is believed he died of natural causes.

In August 2022, Liu Jianchao warned the Israeli ambassador to China, Irit Ben-Abba, against taking the U.S. position on the Uyghur genocide.

Development of bilateral relations

Some say the Chinese have developed a favorable view of Jews, admiring them for their contributions to humanity, their ability to survive and the sharing of Chinese values such as family, frugality, hard work, and education, and being products of ancient civilizations. Shared affinities and similar cultural commonalities has not only been an impetus for the close bonds between China and Israel but has also created a symbol of brotherhood between the two communities.

Though Israel established diplomatic relations with China in 1992, the ties between the Chinese and Jewish people remain centuries old in addition to Israel and China being products of ancient civilizations dating back thousands of years. The cultural similarities between the Chinese and Jewish civilizations with both nations originating thousands of years ago have drawn the two countries closer together making the two countries natural partners in the international community. Chinese Jews have been a major impetus in maintaining the strong nexus between the Chinese and Jewish civilizations. Jews remain a small minority in China, but unlike many parts of the world, Jews have historically lived in China without any instances of antisemitism from the Han majority populace contributing to mutual respect and admiration between the two peoples. With the intrinsic affinity that the Chinese people feel for the Jews, relations between the two communities have been mutually close, harmonious and friendly, due to shared common cultural similarities between the two peoples resulted Jews enjoying equal rights and coexisting peacefully alongside the mainstream Han Chinese populace with instances of Jews assimilating into the Han Chinese community through intermarriage. On a geopolitical scale, China has sought to maintain close relations with the Jewish state as Israel's regional importance, stability and influence in an otherwise volatile region has been an important asset for the expansion of China's influence in the Middle East and the entire world. Shared commonalities and similarities between the cultures and values of the two nations, ancient roots as well as convergence of interests have driven the two countries closer with respect to scientific, economic, diplomatic and cultural ties.

In November 1991, the Defense Minister of Israel Moshe Arens was reported to have paid a secret visit to China and believed to have negotiated the establishment of ties and expansion of military cooperation. On January 23, 1992, the Foreign Minister of Israel David Levy paid a four-day visit to Beijing, preceding the formal establishment of ties. Both nations had maintained some trade links, which stood at US$30 million in 1992. Since then, the annual growth in trade has averaged 40%. Bilateral trade rose to US$3 billion in 2005 and is projected to rise to $5 billion by 2008 and $10 billion by 2010. China is Israel's largest East Asian trading partner and has sought Israel's expertise in solar energy, manufacturing robotics, irrigation, construction, agricultural and water management and desalination technologies to combat drought and water shortages. In turn, Israel has imported high-tech products and manufactured goods from China. There are more than 1,000 Israeli firms operating in China as of 2010. In particular, Chinese firms play an essential role in the $10-billion kosher foods industry, with 500 factories across China producing kosher food for the American and Israeli markets.

Zev Sufott, who had served in the liaison office of the Israel Academy of Sciences and Humanities in Beijing beginning in 1991, was appointed as Israel's first Ambassador to China upon the establishment of diplomatic relations in 1992.

In 2007, Israeli Prime Minister Ehud Olmert (whose father was raised in the northern Chinese city of Harbin, whose Jewish community dated from the 19th century  ), visited China to bolster trade and military cooperation and seek China's support in the conflict over Iran's nuclear proliferation. In June 2012, Olmert's successor, Binyamin Netanyahu, planned to visit China to mark the 20th anniversary of the establishment of bilateral relations, but the visit was cancelled.

As part of the 2010 World Expo, the Shanghai Municipal Government began to allow the city's Jewish community to use the historic Ohel Rachel Synagogue for regular Shabbat services. The Israeli consul Jackie Eldan noted that the gesture was a "special effort", as the synagogue is now located within the compound for the city's education ministry, and that it was "truly highly appreciated by Israel". Following the event, however, such services were discontinued and the site is now only available during the High Holy Days.

In December 2013, Chinese Foreign Minister Wang visited Israel and Palestine. He discussed the importance of the nuclear agreement with Iran and the importance of the continued peace talks.

In November 2021, Israeli President Isaac Herzog and Chinese leader, CCP general secretary Xi Jinping held the first-ever phone call between heads of state of Israel and China. According to the read-out from the Israeli President's Office, Herzog and Xi discussed opportunities to enhance Israeli-Chinese bilateral ties ahead of the 30th anniversary of the establishment of diplomatic relations, in honor of which Herzog and Xi invited each other to visit their respective countries.

Military cooperation

China and Israel have developed close strategic military links with each other. Bilateral military relations have evolved from an initial Chinese policy of secret non-official ties to a close strategic partnership with the modern and militarily powerful Israel. Israel and China began extensive military cooperation as early as the 1980s, even though no formal diplomatic relations existed.

Israel has provided China with military assistance, expertise and technology. According to a report from the United States-China Economic and Security Review Commission, "Israel ranks second only to Russia as a weapons system provider to China and as a conduit for sophisticated cutting edge military technology, followed by France and Germany."

Long before diplomatic relations were established in 1992 Israel had been selling arms to China. The use of military sales as a means of achieving foreign-policy goals was neither new nor unprecedented in Israeli foreign policy to promote its interests. Israel sold technology to upgrade Chinese tanks and planes in the 1980s. IAI Lavi and UAV technology seems to have been sold to China. Expertise in fitting western equipment in Soviet made hardware helped in modernization of Chinese army and air force, this way Chinese defense modernization complemented Israel's need of cash to fund its domestic made high-tech weapons programs.

Events in Tiananmen offered an additional incentive for military relationship, funded in Israel's reputation as a reliable arms supplier. Sanctions imposed by Western countries almost froze Chinese access to advanced military and dual-use technologies. Israel then sought to benefit from the situation and became China's backdoor to western technology.

Israel was ready to sell China the Phalcon, an Israeli airborne early-warning radar system (AWACS), until the United States forced it to cancel the deal. Some estimate that Israel sold arms worth US$4 billion to China in this period.

China had looked to Israel for the arms and military technology it could not acquire from the United States, Europe and Russia. Israel is now China's second-largest foreign supplier of arms after Russia with China having purchased a wide array of military equipment and technology, including communications satellites. China is a vital market for Israel's aerospace and defense industry. Due to Israel's recognition of China, Israel has also limited its cooperation with Taiwan in order to foster closer ties with Mainland China.

The U.S. Defense Intelligence Agency compiled evidence that Israel had transferred missile, laser and aircraft technology to China in the 1990s. On 19 October 1999, the Defense Minister of China, Chi Haotian, flew to Israel and met with Ehud Barak, then-Prime Minister and Defense Minister of Israel. They reached several high-level agreements, including a $1 billion Israeli-Russian sale of military aircraft to China. On 25 May 2011, the Commander of the People's Liberation Army Navy, Admiral Wu Shengli, made an official visit to Israel, meeting with Barak and Rear Admiral Eliezer Marom.

On 14 August 2011, General Chen Bingde, Chief of the People's Liberation Army General Staff Department, made an official visit to Israel, scheduled for three days. He came a guest of the Israeli Chief of Staff Benny Gantz, who received him with an honor guard at the Kirya military headquarters in Tel Aviv. The visit came after Defense Minister Ehud Barak's visit to China in June, the first visit of a defense minister to the country in a decade. Bingde's visit was part of a tour that included stops in Russia and Ukraine.

On 13 August 2012, vessels from the PLA Navy's 11th escort fleet, led by Rear Admiral Yang Jun-fei, anchored at Israel's Haifa naval base for a four-day goodwill visit to mark 20 years of cooperation between the Israel Defense Forces and the PLA. The vessels and crewmen were welcomed by the Haifa base commander, Brigadier General Eli Sharvit, and Chinese embassy officials. In July 2018, 180 acres of the Northern port in Haifa were transferred to Shanghai International Port Group Co. (SIPG) for a 25-year period of management. This sparked a heated discussion in the Israeli press and the academy, as well as a special discussion by the Israeli cabinet. It also came up in discussions between US National Security Advisor John Bolton and Israeli PM Benjamin Netanyahu when they met on January 7, 2019. However, economically insignificant it may be for both China and the US, the Haifa port could become a critical battleground in a new Cold War between the two superpowers.

Economic ties

China is one of Israel's closest economic allies in East Asia where both countries have placed considerable importance on maintaining a strategic and supportive economic relationship. The economic synergy has served the two respective countries greatly where Israel's global technological prowess combined with China's global economic influence, industrial manufacturing capabilities, and marketing expertise made cooperation between the two nations inevitable. China including Hong Kong is Israel's second top export destination after the United States and has been the top market for Israeli exports in East Asia. China is also Israel's third largest trading partner and export market after the United States and the European Union with China being Israel's largest export market in East Asia. Israel has sought China's enormous global influence on world affairs, large consumer market, broad industrial manufacturing scale, and burgeoning economic dynamism while China has sought Israel as a powerhouse of advanced technological wizardry and a wellspring of entrepreneurial acumen leveraging each other's complementary capabilities and resources. China has sought Israel's technology to increase its international economic competitiveness and risk management. With the advice and experience of Jewish entrepreneurs, innovators, and inventors from the high-technology sectors, China has utilized Israel's indispensable economic and technological contributions to foster its long-term economic development. China has also expressed desire for Israel's advanced technologies, particularly in fields related to agriculture, telecommunications, and defense. The scientific and technological advancements made by Israel had led many Chinese politicians to respect the country's ingenuity and creative inventiveness because they know of the contributions that as Israeli agricultural, drip irrigation, and solar energy technologies are seen as crucial to China's economic development. Throughout Israel's early economic history, many Israeli startup companies were acquired by major U.S. and Western European corporations. Since the 2010s, China and Israel enhanced bilateral economic ties with China connecting both Chinese and Israeli businessmen and investors to invest in each other's economies respectively. Chinese economic cooperation with Israel has saw substantial Chinese investment of more than US$15 billion in the Israeli economy, spawning seed capital in Israeli startup companies, as well as the acquisition of Israeli companies by major Chinese corporations that incorporate Israel's know how to help the invigorate the development of the modern Chinese economy more efficiently. China now ranks second after the United States in collaboration with Israeli high-tech firms that are backed by Israel's Office of the Chief Scientist. Major Chinese firms such as Fosun, ChemChina, Brightfood, Horizons Ventures and China Everbright have invested significant amounts of financial capital and resources across numerous Israeli industries. Chinese businessmen and major Chinese corporations hold Israel's business, economic and entrepreneurial acumen and technological expertise with high esteem and have sought to integrate Israel's know-how with China's marketing proficiency, industrial manufacturing capacity and aptitude for large consumer market scaling. Since the mid-2010s, China has increasingly becoming a pillar source of financial funding of Israel's high-tech ecosystem with the influx of Chinese investments in Israeli companies and technologies since the mid-2010s has mutually contributed both the Chinese and Israeli economies. In December 2017, The Jerusalem Post projects that China will soon overtake the United States as Israel's largest investor and leading source of foreign direct investment. Israel has recognized China's potential as a strategic economic partner partially due to China's reputation as a fast growing economy that is projected to the largest economy in the world, making it a colossal opportunity for Israeli companies to do business in the Chinese market and create an array of business interests. Several factors that contributed to the surge of Chinese investment in Israel including a surplus of money among Chinese conglomerate companies and wealthy individuals, a preconceived and favorable notion of Jews as being extremely smart and are blessed with great intelligence, and the warm welcoming reciprocation of China by Israel itself. In addition, China sees Israel as an astute technology exporter and has sought the Israeli technological development that China lacks, fueling the successful cooperation between the two countries.

More than 1000 Israeli start-up companies have set up operations in China. At present, there are thousands of Jewish and Israeli expatriate businessmen residing in various Chinese cities, mainly Shanghai and Beijing looking to do business with Chinese entrepreneurs and Chinese technology companies. Israel's open, innovative and risk-taking approach to high-technology as well as Israel's reputation high-tech superpower has been appealing to the typical Chinese entrepreneur, as the concept of risk taking is not deeply rooted in China's culture with its approach to failure. Chinese delegations regularly go to Israel, clinching deals with Israeli high-tech companies. One example in February 2012 in which both nations signed a $300 million deal to export Israeli water technology to China. With the increasing economic cooperation between the two countries, China is spearheading an increasing number of partnerships with Israeli universities such as the Tel Aviv University and Tsinghua University's $300 million joint research center, a $130 million donation to the Technion, and a program devoted entirely to teaching the Israeli business culture at Peking University. Politicians are also hastening to increase the cooperation between the two countries with former Israeli Economy Minister Naftali Bennett recently visiting China to launch the Israeli Business Center in Shanghai, an initiative that goes hand-in-hand with the China-Israel Joint Committee on Innovation Cooperation, a three-year action plan to strengthen innovation cooperation. Investment from China in Israeli technology reached an aggregate of $15 billion from 2011 to 2017 with the surplus of Chinese investment capital finding its way through Israel's high technology sector, including agriculture, pharmaceutical, medical devices, artificial intelligence and autonomous driving. In addition, some Israeli start-ups are also positioning themselves exclusively in the Chinese market.

On 3 July 2011, Israel and the People's Republic of China signed an economic cooperation agreement to boost trade between the two countries. According to Eliran Elimelech, Israel's commercial attaché in Beijing, the agreement was expected to deepen ties between Israeli and Chinese businessmen in the short term, and in the medium to long term to improve trade conditions between the countries. In January 2011, the Israeli Central Bureau of Statistics stated that Israeli exports to China had grown by an annual 95 percent in 2010 to $2 billion. In September 2011, the Israeli Minister of Transport, Israel Katz, stated that China and Israel were discussing the construction of a high-speed rail link joining the Mediterranean Sea with the Red Sea. This joint project would permit the mass overland transport of Chinese goods to Israel and Eastern Europe, and would involve both Chinese and Israeli railway developers. The following month, the Chinese and Israeli governments signed a memorandum of understanding regarding the joint construction of a 180-km (112-mile) railway linking the Israeli city of Eilat with the Negev Desert's Zin Valley, Beersheba, and Tel Aviv. In August 2012, with Chinese-Israeli trade growing, the Beijing University of International Business and Economics in Beijing set up a department dedicated to studying Israeli economics and Judaism, while some Chinese universities began offering Hebrew courses. The group SIGNAL has established an exchange network of Chinese and Israeli scholars and academics to help them collaborate with each other on various academic projects. Since 2012, with the appearance of the first signs of a crisis in Israel's relationship with the U.S. (and the European Union) with regards to the negotiations with the Palestinians, many Israeli state officials began pointing to China's economic prowess as a possible alternative to the economic dependence on the West. Israel began increasingly engaging trading partners in Asian markets such as China, India and Japan to combat flagging trade growth with Europe as well as facing less political pressure attached to those partnerships. Furthermore, many European countries often utilize their strong economic clout to exert political pressure on Israel with regards to the Israeli-Palestinian and the West Bank settlements.

Bilateral trade between the two nations increased from $50 million to $10 billion in 2013. Since 2013, Chinese investors have begun to show a growing interest in Israeli firms. Recent high end deals include a Chinese donation of $130 million to Technion for a research center, Beijing winning a $2 billion tender to build the "Med-Red" railway linking Ashdod port with Eilat as well as a $1 billion Israeli port tender, a $300 million joint research center between Tel Aviv University and Tsinghua University, and Chinese acquisition of a controlling stake in Israel's Tnuva dairy company for more than US$1 billion. The acquisition of Tnuva was the biggest Chinese buyout of an Israeli company since 2011 when the China National Chemical Corporation bought Adama, the pesticides and crop protection company then known as Makhteshim Agan, for US$2.4 billion. In 2014, Chinese-Israeli tech deals totaled $300 million, up from $50 million in 2013, according to Israel's National Economic Council. Bilateral between the two countries reached in excess of $10 billion in trade since the start of 2015. In January 2015, a number of Chinese information technology companies began to make investments in Israel, Chinese e-commerce giant Alibaba invested an undisclosed sum in Visualead, an Israeli company specialising in QR code technology. Alibaba has also invested in Israel-based venture fund Jerusalem Venture Partners, becoming a limited partner joining Qihoo 360, another Chinese web company to have invested in the Jerusalem-based fund. Baidu, China's largest search engine, has put US$3 million into Pixellot, an Israeli video capture start-up and provided funds to Carmel Ventures, an Israeli venture capital firm as well as lead a $5 million investment round in the Israeli music education firm Tonara. In addition, leading Chinese technology firms such as Huawei, Legend and Xiaomi have set up R&D centers in Israel.

In March 2015, Israel joined China's newly constituted Asian Infrastructure Investment Bank (AIIB), becoming a founding member of the institution postulating that Israel may become a major economic ally of China. In 2013, China and Israel began to boost the economic relations with respect to agriculture. The two countries decided to set up an agriculture technology incubator in Anhui Province, China enabling joint development of agriculture technologies and solutions in keeping with requirements on the ground. Israeli agriculture trade fairs such as Agrivest and AgriTech have witnessed large Chinese delegations and greater participation from Chinese state-owned enterprises and private companies as Chinese's growing middle class and increasing consumer demand as well as increased pressure on agricultural land has prompted the East Asian giant to increasingly look at Israeli agriculture technology to boost crop yields and dairy production. Horizons Ventures, a venture capital firm established by Hong Kong business magnate Li Ka-shing, led a US$10.8 million strategic investment in Windward, an Israeli maritime data and analytics company. MarInt, Windward's satellite maritime analytics system, is widely used by many security, intelligence and law enforcement agencies across the world. In 2013, Li donated US$130 million to Technion. A large part of the money came from the profits he made from the IPO of Waze, an Israeli GPS-based map software company, in which he held an 11 percent stake that eventually acquired by Google.  His was the largest donation ever made to Technion and one of the biggest to any Israeli academic institution. Li has been the pioneer of Chinese investment in Israel and with his investments in Israeli high-tech, Li set the stage for Hong Kong's business elite stressing that it is financially sound and even necessary for the future of Chinese economic prosperity to invest in emerging Israeli technology companies. In the first half of 2015, China invested more than $2 billion compared to just $300 million for all of 2014. Economists are forecasting that Mainland China may surpass the U.S. as Israel's largest trading partner in the near future. On May 25, 2015, the Israeli Trade Authority signed an Authorized Economic Operator (AEO) agreement that simplifies customs and approval procedures for Chinese exporters to Israel. On June 22, 2015, The Israeli conglomerate Delek Group agreed to sell a 52 percent controlling stake of its company to the Chinese civilian-run conglomerate Fosun International. On September 2 2015, Fosun International made another investment in Israel where it agreed to purchase the Ahava cosmetics firm for NIS 300 million (US$77 million). While Protectionism in the United States through the potential impact of Committee on Foreign Investment in the United States on international Chinese investment strategies has made it difficult for Mainland Chinese companies to acquire American assets, Israel has been a receptive host warmly welcoming the influx of excess Chinese cash and investment capital into the country's private sector economy 
which China has sought Israel to invest in as an alternative. Due to the lack of red tape and the wide array of start-up businesses offered by Israel's Silicon Wadi, Chinese investment in Israel jumped more than tenfold in 2016 to a record US$16.5 billion, with money flowing into the country's booming internet, cyber-security and medical device start-ups. On July 31, 2016, a Chinese consortium purchased Playtika, an Israeli online gaming company founded in 2010, for US$4.4 billion in cash. Playtika was a pioneer in the free-to-play games on social networks and mobile platforms and is the creator of popular titles, such as Slotomania, House of Fun and Bingo Blitz, which consistently ranked among the top-grossing games on Apple's App Store, Google Play and Facebook. The Chinese consortium comprised a number of Chinese holding companies and private equity firms such as Giant Investment (HK) Limited, China Oceanwide Holdings Group Co. Ltd., China Minsheng Trust Co. Ltd., CDH China HF Holdings Company Limited, the Hony Capital Fund, and Yunfeng Capital — a private equity firm co-founded by Alibaba's Jack Ma. On February 11, 2017, the Chinese electronics giant Midea Group as part of their industrial automation and intelligent manufacturing campaign acquired control of Petah Tikva-based company Servotronix, an automation solutions developer at the cost of US$170 million. The company was founded by Dr. Ilan Cohen in 1987, develops automation solutions focused on motion control for a diverse range of industries including robotics, printing, textiles, medical equipment, renewable energy, CNC and machine tools, food and beverages, and electronics. The company operates worldwide and has subsidiaries in Germany and Mainland China. On October 2, 2017, the Chinese-owned Israeli-based mobile gaming development company Playtika Ltd. agreed to acquire Israel's Jelly Button Games Ltd. looking to expand its offerings into the casual-game space for an undisclosed sum. Playtika described the Jelly Button acquisition as an important part of its vision to become the world's leading mobile-gaming company. In 2017, China became Israel's fastest growing source of tourists as 2017 was the first year when the number of Chinese tourists surpassed 100,000.

Bilateral issues

Israel's increasing defense cooperation with China has caused concern in Western nations, particularly the United States, which is the largest foreign supplier of military equipment to Israel. Owing to strategic Chinese rivalry with Japan, South Korea, the Philippines, India and Vietnam, as well as concerns over the security of Taiwan, the United States has pressured Israel against selling sophisticated equipment and technology to China. In 1992, The Washington Times alleged that exported American Patriot missiles and Israel's indigenous Lavi jet aircraft technology had been shared with China, although official U.S. investigations did not substantiate these charges. In 2000, Israel cancelled the sale to China of the Israeli-built Phalcon Airborne Warning and Control System (AWACS) in the wake of pressure from the U.S., which threatened to cut off US$2.8 billion in yearly aid if the deal went through. Israel's decision drew condemnation from China, which stated that the cancellation would hurt bilateral ties. China's record of proliferating arms and weapons systems has also concerned U.S. planners, as the U.S. worries that China may repackage advanced Israeli defense technologies for resale to America's rivals and nations hostile to it throughout the world.

Though relations are close and generally good with no particular bilateral problems between the two nations, China and Israel continue to remain divided on the issue of Palestine, Israeli settlements in the West Bank and East Jerusalem, economic blockade of Gaza, and the Israeli West Bank barrier wall. China has criticized Israel's construction of settlements in the West Bank and East Jerusalem. China's then Foreign Minister Li Zhaoxing called the Israeli West Bank barrier wall an obstacle to peace in a September 2006 statement during a UN Security Council meeting on the Middle East. In November 2008, then China Ambassador to the United States Yesui Zhang stated that the "continued construction of settlements on the West Bank is not only in violation of Israel's obligations under international law, but is also detrimental to guaranteeing Israel's own security." According to analysis from the Jamestown Foundation, China's policy on Israel and Palestine is based on soft power diplomacy, and maintain a balancing act between its Israeli and Arab world ties. On June 8, 2015, China demanded Israel to refrain from utilizing Chinese migrant construction workers in Israeli settlements in the West Bank. China sought this ban out of concern for the Chinese workers' safety in areas beyond the Green Line, which marks Israel's pre-1967 borders. The government of Israel has been eager to negotiate a deal with China completed in the hope that an influx of foreign workers will increase the rate of housing construction in Israel and reduce the costs of new homes.

After the victory of Hamas in the 2006 elections in Gaza, China acknowledged Hamas as the legitimately elected political entity in the Gaza Strip despite Israeli and U.S. opposition. The Chinese government met with senior Hamas representative Mahmoud al-Zahar, who previously served as Palestinian foreign minister, during the June 2006 China-Arab Cooperation Forum in Beijing which held direct bilateral talks despite protests from Israel and the United States. A spokesperson for the Chinese Foreign Ministry stated that "the Palestinian government is legally elected by the people there and it should be respected." Besides the Chinese recognition of Hamas, China also does not designate Hezbollah as a terrorist organization.

In 2009, China Radio International (CRI) began broadcasting in Hebrew. This venture has proven a success for the Chinese and a failure for the Israeli media, which uncritically swallow the messages sent out by CRI's Hebrew team. In addition, the Chinese established Chinese institutes in Israel, to public and media activities of Israel-based Chinese diplomats.

In 2012, the families of eight Israeli terror victims of the 2008 Mercaz HaRav massacre in Jerusalem filed a  lawsuit against the Bank of China. The suit asserted that in 2003 the bank's New York branch wired millions of dollars to Hamas from its leadership in Syria and Iran. The Bank of China subsequently denied providing banking services to terrorist groups: "The Bank of China has always strictly followed the UN's anti-money laundering and anti-terrorist financing requirements and regulations in China and other judicial areas where we operate." The case was later settled in which Israel won the lawsuit in July 2014.

Chinese involvement in the Israeli technology sector has also generated security concerns. The former head of Mossad, Efraim Halevy, is one of the major critics in Israel who believes that the country should examine the geopolitical considerations with China and has consistently warned the Israeli government against involving the Chinese in the Red-Med project, arguing that it could lead to a crisis in strategic relations with the United States. Other critics argue that growing Chinese involvement will endanger Israeli security and lead to theft of Israeli technology to be utilized in Chinese espionage further arguing that Israel should balance its burgeoning relations with China with maintaining a balance of relations with the United States at the same time.

In 2010, the United Nations Security Council passed Resolution 1929, imposing a fourth round of sanctions against Iran for its nuclear enrichment program. China ultimately supported this resolution, although initially, due to the strong bilateral relations and nuclear cooperation between the China and Iran, China opposed the sanctions. According to The New York Times, Israel lobbied for the sanctions by explaining to China the impact of any pre-emptive strike on Iran would have on the world oil supply, and hence on the Chinese economy.

After the May 31, 2010 Gaza flotilla raid the Chinese Foreign Ministry spokesman Ma Zhaoxu condemned Israel. On April 28, 2011, after the rival Palestinian factions Fatah and Hamas formed a national unity government, Chinese Foreign Ministry spokesman Hong Lei said that China welcomed the internal reconciliation. During the November 2012 Operation Pillar of Defense in the Gaza Strip, the Ministry of Foreign Affairs of the People's Republic of China urged all sides to display restraint.

On November 29, 2012, China voted in favor of UN General Assembly Resolution 67/19 Palestine to non-member observer state status in the United Nations. On June 3, 2014, China recognized the Palestinian unity government between Hamas and Fatah.

On July 23, 2014, China was among the 29 nations who voted in favor of the investigation by the United Nations Human Rights Council of war crimes committed by Israel during Operation Protective Edge, with the United States being the only nation in dissent. In addition, Chinese Foreign Ministry Spokesperson Hong Lei earlier on 9 July 2014 issued a statement in response to the violence during the military operation, stating: "We believe that to resort to force and to counter violence with violence will not help resolve problems other than pile up more hatred. We urge relevant parties to bear in mind the broader picture of peace and the lives of the people, immediately realize a ceasefire, stick to the strategic choice of peace talks and strive for an early resumption of talks." In July 2017, Chinese leader Xi Jinping delivered a formalization of China's positions in his "Four Points" on the "issue of Israel-Palestine conflict", the first of which was that China supported the establishment of an independent, sovereign Palestine within the framework of the two-state solution based on the 1967 borders, with East Jerusalem as its capital.

In May 2021, Israel's embassy in Beijing accused Chinese state media outlet China Global Television Network of "blatant antisemitism" when host Zheng Junfeng broadcast a segment accusing US policy on Israel of being influenced by wealthy Jews, during the 2021 Israel–Palestine crisis.

See also

 A Jewish Girl in Shanghai, a 2010 Chinese animated film
 China–Palestine relations
 Chinese people in Israel
 Dates of establishment of diplomatic relations with the People's Republic of China
 History of the Jews in China
 Hong Kong–Israel relations
 International recognition of Israel
 Israelis in China
 Kaifeng Jews

References

External links
Israel Asia Center – Building a shared future between Israel and Asia
Is There a Match for Tech Between China and Israel?, Wharton University, June 20, 2017

 
Israel
Bilateral relations of Israel